The 2012 season was the Kansas City Chiefs' 43rd in the National Football League (NFL), their 53rd overall and their first and only full season under head coach Romeo Crennel, who had served as the interim head coach for the final three games of the 2011 season following Todd Haley's termination. The Chiefs failed to rebound from their 7–9 record in 2011, and were eliminated from playoff contention in Week 12. Although they shared the same 2–14 record as the Jacksonville Jaguars for the worst record of the season, the Chiefs had a lower strength of schedule, so they were awarded the first pick in the 2013 NFL Draft. The Chiefs went 0–12 against AFC opponents in 2012; their only wins of the season were from NFC teams, against the Carolina Panthers and New Orleans Saints. In 2017, ESPN.com named the 2012 season the Chiefs’ worst in franchise history. The season remains, as of 2023, the most recent season that the Chiefs had a losing record.

On December 1, 2012, the day before the Chiefs' week 13 game against the Carolina Panthers, linebacker Jovan Belcher murdered his girlfriend then drove to Arrowhead Stadium where he killed himself in front of Crennel and general manager Scott Pioli. The Chiefs held a moment of silence for domestic violence victims and the teams met for a prayer on the field prior to the game.

Season summary
The 2012 team tied the 1977 (2–12) and 2008 (2–14) teams for the franchise worst seasons in terms of fewest wins. The 2008 and 2012 seasons were the worst in terms of win percentage (.125) in franchise history.

They tied with the Jacksonville Jaguars for the NFL's worst record. The Chiefs had the number 1 pick in the 2013 National Football League Draft based on strength of schedule. It was the second time in franchise history the Chiefs have had the #1 pick.

Kansas City suffered from quarterback controversy all season. The Chiefs were tied with the Arizona Cardinals for most interceptions (20) with Matt Cassel throwing 12 and his late season replacement Brady Quinn throwing 8.

The Chiefs started the season tying the 1929 record of Buffalo Bisons for most games without ever leading in regulation (8 games). The Chiefs did defeat the Saints in week 3, but didn't lead until their game winning field goal in overtime. The Chiefs broke the streak in Week 10 against the Pittsburgh Steelers when they led 10–0 in the second quarter before losing the game 16–13 in overtime. In Week 4, the Chiefs had six turnovers in a loss to San Diego. Chiefs tackle Eric Winston claimed Kansas City hometown fans cheered the injury of quarterback Matt Cassel in a Week 5 loss to the Baltimore Ravens calling it "Sick", however fans claim it was because Brady Quinn was seen coming onto the field and were cheering for him. Fans formed the "Save Our Chiefs" organization. They wore black to games to protest and hired an airplane to fly over Arrowhead Stadium on game days towing a banner that read, "Restore Hope: Fire Pioli." When asked why running back Jamaal Charles carried the ball only 5 times in a week 8 loss to the Oakland Raiders, Romeo Crennel responded "Now, that I'm not exactly sure, either." In Week 15, the Chiefs didn't have a first down until the third quarter in a loss against Oakland. In Week 16, the team rushed for a franchise record of 352 yards against the Colts and still lost the game. In Week 17, the Chiefs matched the 1981 Baltimore Colts season record of losing 9 games by 14 points or more in one season as the Chiefs lost to Denver.

The Chiefs finished near the bottom of the league in most major statistical categories. They were 23rd in total offense, 32nd in points scored, and 37 giveaways, tied for worst in the NFL. The Chiefs were 20th in total defense and 25th in points allowed. The Chiefs tied for the fewest takeaways with the Eagles. Their low forced turnovers and giveaways led the Chiefs to finish tied for the worst turnover differential in the NFL with a −24.

Roster changes

Free agency

Draft

Notes
 Acquired via trade with the New England Patriots for S Jarrad Page.

Staff

Final roster

Schedule

Preseason

Regular season

Note: Intra-division opponents are in bold text.

Game summaries

Week 1: vs. Atlanta Falcons

Week 2: at Buffalo Bills

Week 3: at New Orleans Saints

Week 4: vs. San Diego Chargers

Week 5: vs. Baltimore Ravens

Week 6: at Tampa Bay Buccaneers

Week 8: vs. Oakland Raiders

Week 9: at San Diego Chargers

Week 10: at Pittsburgh Steelers

Week 11: vs. Cincinnati Bengals

Week 12: vs. Denver Broncos

Week 13: vs. Carolina Panthers

Week 14: at Cleveland Browns

Week 15: at Oakland Raiders

Week 16: vs. Indianapolis Colts

Week 17: at Denver Broncos

Standings

Division

Conference

References

External links

Kansas City
Kansas City Chiefs seasons
2012 in sports in Missouri